Clare Griffiths may refer to:
 Clare Griffiths (basketball)
 Clare Griffiths (historian)
 Clare Griffiths (statistician)